There were seven elections in 1893 for United States House of Representatives in the 53rd United States Congress. There were no special elections that year for the 52nd United States Congress, which ended March 3, 1893.

List of elections 
Elections are listed by date and district.

|-
| 
| Henry Cabot Lodge
|  | Republican
| 1886
|  | Incumbent member-elect resigned during previous congress to become U.S. senator.New member  elected April 25, 1893.Democratic gain.
| nowrap | 

|-
| 
| William Mutchler
|  | Democratic
| 
|  | Incumbent died June 23, 1893.New member elected August 7, 1893.Democratic hold.
| nowrap | 

|-
| 
| John L. Mitchell
|  | Democratic
| 1890
|  | Incumbent member-elect resigned during previous congress to become U.S. senator.New member  elected April 4, 1893.Democratic hold.
| nowrap | 

|-
| 
| J. Logan Chipman
|  | Democratic
| 
|  | Incumbent died August 17, 1893.New member  December 4, 1893.Democratic hold.
| nowrap | 

|-
| 
| William H. Enochs
|  | Republican
| 
|  | Incumbent died July 13, 1893.New member  December 4, 1893.Republican hold.
| nowrap | 

|-
| 
| Charles O'Neill
|  | Republican
| 
|  | Incumbent died November 25, 1893.New member  December 19, 1893.Republican hold.
| nowrap | 

|}

See also 
 52nd United States Congress
 53rd United States Congress

References

 
1893